Daphnella monocincta is a species of sea snail, a marine gastropod mollusc in the family Raphitomidae.

This species is considered by J. Tucker as a synonym of the variety Eucyclotoma stegeri monocincta Nowell-Usticke, G.W., 1969

Description

Distribution
This marine species occurs in the Caribbean Sea off Antigua.

References

 Nowell-Usticke, G. W. "A supplementary listing of new shells." To be added to the checklist of the marine shells of St. Croix, Privately printed (1969): 1-32.

monocincta
Gastropods described in 1969